North Greenwich was a railway station named after the North Greenwich area of the Isle of Dogs in London. It was located on the north side of the River Thames near Island Gardens in the east of the city, and is not to be confused with the present-day North Greenwich station on the London Underground's Jubilee line, which is located on the south side of the river, one mile downstream on the Greenwich Peninsula.

History

Opened in July 1872 (slightly later than the other stations on the branch) with the official name North Greenwich & Cubitt Town, it connected with a ferry service to Greenwich south of the river. The ferry was later replaced by the Greenwich Foot Tunnel.

Traffic at the station was always light and, as with the rest of the MER, it closed to passengers in May 1926, though goods transport continued until the demise of the docks in the 1970s. The area was heavily redeveloped following the Docklands developments of the 1980s, and most of the Docklands Light Railway (DLR) between Island Gardens and South Quay utilises the old MER route. The original Island Gardens DLR station (at that time the DLR's southern terminus) was built on the north end of the original North Greenwich station site when the DLR opened in 1987. When the DLR was extended to Lewisham in the 1990s, a new Island Gardens DLR station was built on the opposite side of Manchester Road, and the former site was demolished and replaced by a block of flats.

References

Disused railway stations in the London Borough of Tower Hamlets
Railway stations in Great Britain opened in 1872
Railway stations in Great Britain closed in 1926
Former London and Blackwall Railway stations
Millwall